Johnny B. Goode is a posthumous live album by Jimi Hendrix released in June 1986. It contains three songs from Hendrix's performance at the 1970 Atlanta International Pop Festival on July 4, 1970, and two songs from Berkeley Community Theatre on May 30, 1970.

Marketed as a "mini LP" soundtrack, it was released at the same time as a video album with the same title, but with more performances from Atlanta Pop.  More complete performances from both concerts were released on Live at Berkeley (2003) and Freedom: Atlanta Pop Festival (2015) (see Jimi Hendrix videography for more information about video releases).

Critical reception 
In The Village Voice, Robert Christgau gave Johnny B. Goode an "A−" and called it "vivid testimony to the uses of digital mastering for archival music", finding the sound particularly "powerful" on side one. He highlighted the "intense" rendition of "All Along the Watchtower" and "Johnny B. Goode", writing that Hendrix's performance of the latter song is "the definitive version of the definitive guitar anthem". Paul Evans gave it three-and-a-half stars in The Rolling Stone Album Guide (1992).

Track listing
All tracks written by Jimi Hendrix, except where noted.

Personnel
Jimi Hendrix – guitar, vocals
Mitch Mitchell – drums
Billy Cox – bass guitar

References

External links 
 

Live albums published posthumously
Jimi Hendrix live albums
1986 live albums
Capitol Records live albums